Theodore Judson (born December 19, 1951)  is an American science fiction writer and high school teacher. He began writing after the death of his wife and he is the author of Tom Wedderburn's Life (2002), Fitzpatrick's War (2004), The Martian General's Daughter (2008), The Sultan's Emissary (2008) (a short story published in the anthology Sideways in Crime), The Thief Catcher (2008) (in Future Americas) and Hell Can Wait (2010). He grew up in a farming community in western Wyoming and graduated from the University of Wyoming.

External links
 Theodore Judson's Blog
 Judson's entry in Wyoming Author's Wiki
 Publisher's page for The Martian General's Daughter at Pyr website

Sources
Biographical Reference

1951 births
Living people
21st-century American novelists
American science fiction writers
Writers from Wyoming
University of Wyoming alumni
American male novelists
21st-century American male writers